Oju may refer to:

Oju, Estonia, a village in Saare County
Oju, Nigeria, a local government area in Benue State
Oju, the art name of Yi Gyu-gyeong, Joseon Silhak scholar